Nasirabad Kulgam is a village in the Kulgam district and has a highest  literacy rate of 100%. All the population belongs to the Ahmadiyya sect of Islam. The main source of income is employment, agriculture and to some extent the crafts. According to recent census reports, the total population of the village is about 2000, which includes 1220 males.

Villages in Kulgam district